I Am Easy to Find is the eighth studio album by American indie rock band The National, released on May 17, 2019, via 4AD. The follow-up to the band's 2017 album, Sleep Well Beast, it was supported by the lead single, "You Had Your Soul with You", and accompanied by a short film of the same name, directed by Mike Mills and starring Alicia Vikander. Vikander is also featured on the album cover. A trailer was released for the companion film along with the announcement of the album. A tour promoting the album began in June 2019.

Background
The bulk of the album was recorded at Long Pond studio in Hudson Valley, New York. Parts were recorded in other cities, including Paris, Berlin, Dublin, Cincinnati, Austin, and Brooklyn. The album and film, while having influenced each other, were essentially made separately. A press release stated that the album "is not the soundtrack" for the film; the idea for the album itself came after the film was shot.

The album features female vocalists including Lisa Hannigan, Sharon Van Etten, Mina Tindle, Gail Ann Dorsey, Kate Stables, and the Brooklyn Youth Chorus.

Critical reception 

I Am Easy to Find was met with near-universal acclaim, receiving a score of 81 on Metacritic, the review aggregating site. Reviewing in his Substack-published "Consumer Guide" column, Robert Christgau said that "almost every track is open to substantive female input on a musical whole that feels consistently interactive and empathetic and also not so glum—even when you can’t pin down exact meanings, it makes love sound possible." More negative critics, such as The Observers Phil Mongredien, complained about the album's flatness and inaccessibility.

Year-end rankings

Track listing
All tracks are written by Matt Berninger and produced by Aaron Dessner, unless noted otherwise.

Notes
 The album's liner notes credit all lyrics as written by Berninger, Besser and Mills; and all music as composed by A. Dessner and B. Dessner. Track-by-track credits are adapted from Tidal.
  "Not in Kansas" contains an interpolation of "Noble Experiment", originally performed by Thinking Fellers Union Local 282 on the album Strangers from the Universe, written by Mark Davies, Anne Eickelberg, Brian Hageman, Jay Paget and Hugh Swarts.

Personnel

The National – arrangement, performance
 Matt Berninger
 Aaron Dessner
 Bryce Dessner – orchestration
 Bryan Devendorf
 Scott Devendorf
 Benjamin Lanz – touring member
 Kyle Resnick – touring member

Featured vocalists
 Gail Ann Dorsey 
 Eve Owen 
 Diane Sorel 
 Mina Tindle 
 Lisa Hannigan 
 Sharon Van Etten 
 Kate Stables 
 Brooklyn Youth Chorus 

Technical personnel
 Jonathan Low – recording, additional mixing, score mixing
 Bella Blasko – assistant engineering
 Peter Katis – album mixing
 Zach Seivers – score sound design
 Greg Calbi – mastering
 Steve Fallone – mastering
 Sean O'Brien – additional recording
 Aaron Dessner – additional production, additional recording
 Bryce Dessner – additional production
 Matt Berninger – additional production
 Curt Kiser – additional production 
 Thomas Bunio – additional recording
 Isaac Joel Karns – additional recording
 Steph Marriano – additional recording
 Ber Quinn – additional recording
 Andi Toma – additional recording
 Eli Walker II – additional recording
 Jan St. Werner – additional recording

Artwork
 Osk – album design
 Mike Mills – creative direction

Additional musicians
 Thomas Bartlett – keyboards, piano
 Andrew Broder – drum programming
 Eric Cha-Beach – percussion, chord stick
 Gail Ann Dorsey – vocals
 Lisa Hannigan – vocals
 Isaac Joel Karns – synthesizer
 Benjamin Lanz – synthesizer, trombone
 Mélissa Laveaux – vocals
 Padma Newsome – strings
 Eve Owen – vocals
 Kyle Resnick – vocals
 Alexander Ridha – synthesizer
 Ben Sloan – drums
 Diane Sorel – vocals
 Jan St. Werner – programming
 Kate Stables – vocals
 Mina Tindle – vocals
 Andi Toma – programming
 Jason Treuting – drums, percussion, chord stick
 Sharon Van Etten – vocals
 Justin Vernon – OP-1

Orchestration
 Jonathan Gandelsman – 1st violin 
 Katie Hyun – 1st violin 
 Monica Davis – 1st violin 
 Ben Russell – 1st violin 
 Charlotte Juillard – 1st violin 
 Domitille Gillon – 1st violin 
 Nikolai Spassov – 1st violin 
 Marc Desjardins – 1st violin 
 Ariadna Teyssier – 1st violin 
 Rachel Shapiro – 2nd violin 
 Guillaume Pirard – 2nd violin 
 Sarah Whitney – 2nd violin 
 Emily Dagget Smith – 2nd violin 
 Leslie Boulin Raulet – 2nd violin 
 Matthias Piccin – 2nd violin 
 Pauline Hauswirth – 2nd violin 
 Emilie Duch-Sauzeau – 2nd violin 
 Caitlyn Lynch – viola 
 Caleb Burhans – viola 
 Miranda Sielaff – viola 
 Sarah Chenaf – viola 
 Marine Gandon – viola 
 Benachir Boukhatem – viola 
 Wolfram Koessel – cello 
 Andrea Lee – cello 
 Alan Richardson – cello 
 Juliette Salmona – cello 
 Barbara Le Liepvre – cello 
 Ella Jarrige – cello 
 Logan Coale – double bass 
 Thomas Garoche – bass 
 Grégoire Dubruel – bass 

Brooklyn Youth Chorus
 Maya Baijal
 Jeanne Bransbourg
 Joseph Brooks
 Morgan Colton
 Cora Clum
 Fannie Feynberg
 Thalia Glyptis
 Lila Hasenstab
 Natalie Hawkins
 Amayah Hutchinson
 Abigail Lienhard
 Raquel Klein
 Maya Renaud-Levine
 Clara Rosarius
 Maya Sequira
 Tafyana Sgaraglino
 Avery Soto
 Sarah Sotomayor
 Katy Urda
 Anna Vartsaba
 Clementine Vonnegut
 Mariana Weaver
 Aliyah Weiss
 Dianne Berkun Menaker – artistic direction

Short film

Director Mike Mills developed a short film based on early clips of the songs featured on the album. As the two projects developed concurrently, the final songs used in each differ from one another.

Mills chose the title for both the short film and the album from a lyric in the song of the same name. The song was originally titled "Washington" before Mills insisted on altering it.

Cast
Alicia Vikander
Kate Adams as Young mother
Riley Shanahan as Young father

Charts

Weekly charts

Year-end charts

References

2019 albums
The National (band) albums
4AD albums
Albums produced by Bryce Dessner